Brett Chalmers (born 23 April 1973) is a former Australian rules footballer who played in the Australian Football League.

A highly rated player from Port Adelaide in the South Australian National Football League, Chalmers was first drafted to the VFL/AFL by the Richmond Football Club with the No. 103 selection in the 1989 VFL draft; however, Chalmers never took up the offer and remained in the SANFL for the next three years. After Richmond's claim to him expired, he nominated for the 1992 AFL National Draft, and was selected by the Collingwood Football Club with the No. 10 selection. However, it soon emerged that Chalmers had engaged in draft tampering: in an attempt to get to Collingwood, he had contacted most other AFL clubs and told them that he would remain in the SANFL if another club drafted him. In response, the AFL issued Chalmers a huge $30,000 fine, and made him ineligible to play for Collingwood for three years.

He played four seasons for the Adelaide Crows, then two seasons for the Port Adelaide Power, playing a total of 75 AFL games in his career.

Personal life 
Chalmers is the father of Olympic gold medallist swimmer  Kyle Chalmers.

References

External links

1973 births
Adelaide Football Club players
Port Adelaide Football Club players
Port Adelaide Football Club players (all competitions)
Port Adelaide Magpies players
Australian rules footballers from South Australia
Port Adelaide Football Club (SANFL) players
Living people